Mimoso refers to several cities in Brazil.
Mimoso, a city in the state of Mato Grosso do Sul
Mimoso, a city in the state of Pernambuco
Mimoso de Goiás, a city in the state of Goiás
Mimoso do Sul, a city in the state of Espírito Santo